Mehtiana is a village in Hoshiarpur district . District headquarters Hoshiarpur is about 18.4 kilometres from the village. Punjabi is the widely spoken language in the area. Hoshiarpur and phagwara are neaby cities to the village. It is connected via NH344B road. It is a modern village with facilities like electricity, medical clinic(private), Schools (government,private), Bus facility etc. Mount Carmel School, Mehtiana is a major school in area. GNA Group, Mehtiana is a major source of employment for the area.

Location
Mehtiana village is situated between Phagwara and Hoshiarpur stretch of National Highway 344B in Hoshiarpur II Tehsil in the state of Punjab. This village is 19 Kilometres from Hoshiarpur and 15 kilometres from Adampur.

Nearby
Hoshiarpur, Phagwara, Adampur are the nearby cities to Mehtiana and some nearby village are Simbli and Rehana Jattan.

References

Villages in Hoshiarpur district